Golden Wings Charter is an Air Charter airline based in Nassau, Bahamas.

Fleet Information

1 - Piper PA-31 Navajo
2 - Piper Aztec

External links
Golden Wings Charter
Air Charter Guide

Airlines of the Bahamas
Airlines established in 2002